Rashida (1912 – 26 March 1990) was a Uyghur Chinese politician. She was one of the first group of women elected to the Legislative Yuan of the Republic of China in 1948.

Biography
Rashida (sometimes romanised 'La-hsi-ta') was from Yining County in Xinjiang. She attended Tashkent Normal University of Technology in the Soviet Union, graduating in 1933. In 1937 she began working at the Xinjiang Consulate in Zaysan, a border town in the Soviet Union. After returning to China, she worked as a middle school teacher and headteacher. She also became deputy director of the Xinjiang Women's Federation, joined the Kuomintang and married Burhan Shahidi, a prominent Uyghur politician.

In the 1948 elections to the Legislative Yuan, ten seats were elected by the Education Association, of which two were reserved for women. Rashida was chosen to fill one of the two women's seats, becoming one of the first group of women to enter the Chinese parliament. After the Chinese Civil War, she became deputy head of the Children's Welfare Department of the All-China Women's Federation, served as a member of the All-China Women's Federation Presidium, and was a delegate to the second to seventh National Committee of the Chinese People's Political Consultative Conference. A member of the standing committee of the Islamic Association of China, She joined the Chinese Communist Party in 1985.

She died in Beijing in March 1990.

References

Members of the 1st Legislative Yuan
20th-century Chinese women politicians
Uyghur politicians
Chinese schoolteachers
Members of the Kuomintang
Chinese Communist Party politicians
1912 births
1990 deaths
People from Yining County